Parilexia proditata is a species of geometrid moth from the Geometridae family. It is found in the Caribbean Sea and North America.

The MONA or Hodges number for Parilexia proditata is 6712.

References

Further reading

 

Caberini
Articles created by Qbugbot
Moths described in 1861